"Goodbye Angels" is the fourth single from The Getaway, an album by the American rock band Red Hot Chili Peppers. The song was released to radio on April 4, 2017. This would be the final single the band would release with guitarist Josh Klinghoffer, as previous guitarist John Frusciante returned to the band in 2019.

Music video
On April 14, 2017, Chad Smith announced on Twitter that the band would be shooting the video for the song that night at their show in Atlanta, and for fans to "wear something colorful". The video for Goodbye Angels was released on May 9, 2017, and is directed by Thoranna Sigurdardottir also known as TOTA and stars Klara Kristin.

The video switches between a storyline following a girl's night and live footage of the band. Initially, the girl is partying with friends in a parking lot, and soon she has to outrun a security guard and she steals a bike to pedal to a show. When she arrives, she steals someone's beer, and encounters Anthony Kiedis, Chad Smith, and Flea backstage. She briefly makes out with another woman in a toilet to get a pill from her pocket, then watches the rest of the show. By the end, she finds herself crying alone as crew members clear the empty arena.

Live performances
"Goodbye Angels" was first performed live in July 2016 at the band's T in the Park headlining set in Scotland.

In other media
"Goodbye Angels" was featured in advertisements for the second season of the television series Animal Kingdom.

Personnel

Red Hot Chili Peppers
Anthony Kiedis – lead vocals
Josh Klinghoffer – guitar, backing vocals, keyboards
Flea – bass
Chad Smith – drums, percussion

Additional musicians
Brian "Danger Mouse" Burton – synthesizers
Beverley Chitwood – choir 
Alexx Daye – choir 
David Loucks – choir 
Kennya Ramsey – choir
Matthew Selby – choir 
SJ Hasman – choir 
Loren Smith – choir 
Gregory Whipple – choir

Charts

References

2016 songs
2017 singles
Red Hot Chili Peppers songs
Danger Mouse
Warner Records singles
Songs about loneliness
Songs about suicide
Songs written by Anthony Kiedis
Songs written by Flea (musician)
Songs written by Josh Klinghoffer
Songs written by Chad Smith